Lisa A. Carty is an American diplomat who serves as United States ambassador to the United Nations Economic and Social Council in the Biden administration.

Early life and education 
Carty was raised in New York City and suburban New Jersey. She earned a Bachelor of Arts degree Walsh School of Foreign Service at Georgetown University and a Master of Public Health from Johns Hopkins University.

Career 
Carty served as Director for Humanitarian Financing and Resource Mobilization with the United Nations Office for the Coordination of Humanitarian Affairs.  She has had leadership roles in both the public and non-profit sectors; this includes twenty-five years as a diplomat with the U.S. Foreign Service. With the service, she held overseas assignments in Asia, the Middle East, and Russia. Her tenure at the United Nations has included work with the UNRWA for Palestinian Refugees, as well as with the Joint United Nations Programme on HIV/AIDS. Carty has also helped lead the work of the Bill & Melinda Gates Foundation’s Global Health Program and was a senior adviser at the Center for Strategic and International Studies in Washington, DC.

Nominations to the UN
On June 25, 2021, President Joe Biden nominated Carty to be the United States ambassador to the United Nations Economic and Social Council, as well as an alternate representative to the United Nations. Hearings on her nominations were held before the Senate Foreign Relations Committee on October 5, 2021. The committee favorably reported her nominations to the Senate floor on November 3, 2021. The nominations expired at the end of the year and were returned to President Biden on January 3, 2022.

President Biden renominated her to both positions the next day. The committee favorably reported both nominations to the Senate floor on January 12, 2022. On February 8, 2022, The Senate confirmed Carty to be the US Ambassador to the UN Economic and Social Council by a vote of 68-27. She started her assignment on March 2, 2022.

Carty was later confirmed to be an alternate representative to the UN on March 29, 2022, via voice vote. She started this assignment on April 8, 2022.

Personal life 
Carty is married to William J. Burns, a career diplomat serving as the director of the Central Intelligence Agency. Carty and Burns have two daughters. She speaks French.

References 

Living people
American women diplomats
Walsh School of Foreign Service alumni
Johns Hopkins Bloomberg School of Public Health
United States Foreign Service personnel
UNRWA officials
Year of birth missing (living people)